Pevarini (misspelled peverini in one notable source) are a traditional cookie of Venice. They are made with molasses, lard, white pepper, and flour.

References

Italian pastries
Biscuits
Cuisine of Veneto